Port Vale Football Club, an English association football club based in the town of Burslem, in Stoke-on-Trent, was founded in the late 1870s. In the club's early history, there was no league football, so matches were arranged on an occasional basis, supplemented by cup competitions organised at both local and national level. The club changed its name to Burslem Port Vale in 1884. In 1888, Burslem Port Vale joined the Combination, a league set up to provide organised football for those clubs not invited to join the Football League which was to start the same year. However, the Combination was not well organised, and folded in April 1889 with many fixtures still outstanding. Burslem Port Vale were founder members of the Midland League in 1890, and two years later were elected to the newly formed Second Division of the Football League. They failed re-election in 1896 and spent two seasons in the Midland League, before winning re-election back into the Football League Second Division. However they continued to struggle and folded in 1907. At this stage, North Staffordshire Church League champions Cobridge Church sought permission from the Football Association to change the club's name to Port Vale and bought the old club's ground. This was the start of a 12-year process that saw the newly formed club work its way through the North Staffordshire Federation League, North Staffordshire & District League and The Central League, to secure election into the Football League in October 1919. The club have remained in the Football League since that time, winning the Third Division North in 1929–30 and 1953–54 seasons and the Fourth Division title in 1958–59.

Port Vale's first team have competed in a number of nationally contested leagues, and their record against each club faced in those competitions is summarised below. The opening match of the 1888–89 Combination season pitted them against Birmingham St George's, their first Football League match was against Small Heath, and they met their 200th and most recent different league opponent, Sutton United, for the first time in the 2021–22 season. Port Vale beat Sutton United 2–0 on 26 March 2022 to become the only club in the top four divisions of the English football league system to have beaten every one of the other 91 teams in a competitive league fixture. The team that Port Vale have played most in league competition is Bradford City, whom they first met in the 1903–04 season; Bradford have drawn 32 games with Port Vale, more than any other team. Barnsley have beaten Port Vale 44 times in the league, more than any other team, whilst Port Vale have likewise recorded more league victories against Barnsley than against any other club, having beaten them 43 times out of 104 attempts.

Key
The table includes results of matches played by Port Vale (under that name and under the former name of Burslem Port Vale) in The Combination (1888–89), the English Football League (1892–96, 1898–1907, 1919–39, and 1946–2022), the Midland League (1890–92 and 1896–98), the North Staffordshire Federation League (1907–08), the North Staffordshire & District League (1908–11), and The Central League (1911–15). Matches from the English Football League play-offs and matches in the various wartime competitions (in the 1916–17, 1917–18, 1918–19, 1939–40, 1944–45 and 1945–46 seasons) are not included.
The name used for each opponent is the name they had when Port Vale most recently played a league match against them. Results against each opponent include results against that club under any former name. For example, results against Leyton Orient include matches played against Orient (1966–1987) and Clapton Orient (before 1945).
The columns headed "First" and "Last" contain the first and most recent seasons in which Port Vale played league matches against each opponent.
P = matches played; W = matches won; D = matches drawn; L = matches lost; Win% = percentage of total matches won
  Clubs with this background and symbol in the "Opponent" column are Port Vale's divisional rivals in the current season, 2021–22 EFL League Two.
  Clubs with this background and symbol in the "Opponent" column are defunct.
Clubs listed in italics are not current members of the English Football League or Premier League.
Statistics correct as of the end of the 2021–22 season.

All-time league record

Footnotes

References
General

 
 

Specific

League record by opponent
English football club league records by opponent